Istiblennius flaviumbrinus is a species of combtooth blenny found in the western Indian Ocean, specifically the Red Sea. Males of this species can reach a maximum of  SL, while females can reach a maximum of  SL.

References

flaviumbrinus
Fish described in 1830